Fritz Kaufmann (15 April 1905 – 22 January 1941) was a Swiss ski jumper and Nordic combined skier who competed in the 1930s. He was born in Grindelwald.

Kaufmann won a silver medal in the individual large hill at the 1931 FIS Nordic World Ski Championships in Oberhof. At the 1932 Winter Olympics he finished sixth in the ski jumping competition and 23rd in the Nordic combined event.

References

External links
 

1905 births
1941 deaths
Swiss male ski jumpers
Swiss male Nordic combined skiers
Olympic ski jumpers of Switzerland
Olympic Nordic combined skiers of Switzerland
Ski jumpers at the 1932 Winter Olympics
Nordic combined skiers at the 1932 Winter Olympics
People from Grindelwald
FIS Nordic World Ski Championships medalists in ski jumping
Sportspeople from the canton of Bern